Yaqubabad (also Romanized as Ya‘qūbābād) is a village in Basharyat-e Sharqi Rural District, Basharyat District, Abyek County, Qazvin Province, Iran. At the 2006 census, its population was 46, in 11 families.

References 

Populated places in Abyek County